Speightstown is a community in Barbados.

 Speightstown (horse) – an American racehorse.
  – a ship launched at Liverpool in 1784 and lost in 1784